Kejsaren is a 1979 Swedish drama film directed by Jösta Hagelbäck. At the 15th Guldbagge Awards, Anders Åberg won the award for Best Actor. It was entered into the 29th Berlin International Film Festival, where cinematographer Sten Holmberg won the Silver Bear for an outstanding single achievement.

Cast
 Anders Åberg - Elje Ström
 Sigurd Björling - Vicar
 Grazyna Brattander - Polish whore
 Kent-Arne Dahlgren - Matros
 Jan Dolata - Pimp
 Rune Ek - Farmhand
 Gunnar Ekström - Anton
 Göte Fyhring - Rättare
 Per Gavelius - Harbour Guard
 Ralf Glaerum - Kock
 Olle Grönstedt - Man i keps
 Gerissa Jalander - Moder
 Jan Jönsson - Dåre
 Anne-Lie Kinnunen - Sångerska
 Jan Kruse - Embassy official

References

External links

1979 films
1979 drama films
Swedish drama films
1970s Swedish-language films
Films set in Gotland
1970s Swedish films